Solomon Gandz (2 February 1883, Tarnobrzeg, Austria – 30 March 1954) was a historian of science.

Gandz published on the history of mathematics and astronomy in medieval Jewish and Islamic civilizations.

From 1915 to 1919, Gandz was professor of Jewish theology and Jewish history in the gymnasium and realschule in Vienna.

From 1923 to 1234, he was librarian and professor of Arabic and Medieval Hebrew at the Rabbi Isaac Elchanan Theological Seminary of Yeshiva University in New York.

From 1942 until his death in March 1954, he was research professor of the history of Semitic Civilization at the Dropsie College for Hebrew and Cognate Learning in Philadelphia, Pennsylvania, (except for the war years when he was in government service).

Selections from his collected works were published by KTAV Publishing House NY in 1970. "Studies in Hebrew Astronomy and Mathematics" by Solomon Gandz. Selected with an introduction by Professor Shlomo Sternberg of Harvard. 

Among his major works is his annotated translation of Maimonides' Code "Sanctification of the New Moon" included in the Yale Judaica Series as well as his edition of Mishnat ha-Middot.

Works
 Gandz, S.: "The invention of the decimal fractions and the application of the exponential calculus by Immanuel Bonfils of Tarascon (c. 1350)", Isis 25 (1936), 16–45.
 Solomon Gandz: "Studies in Hebrew Astronomy and Mathematics"  Selected with an introduction by Professor Shlomo Sternberg of Harvard. KTAV Publishing House NY 1970.

See also 
 Astronomy in medieval Islam
 Mathematics in medieval Islam

References 
 Martin Levey, "Solomon Gandz, 1884-1954", Isis Vol. 46, No. 2 (Jun., 1955), pp. 107–110 .

1883 births
1954 deaths
20th-century Austrian historians
Jewish historians
Historians of astronomy
Historians of mathematics
Jews from Galicia (Eastern Europe)
People from Tarnobrzeg